The Keystone Cops (often spelled "Keystone Kops") are fictional, humorously incompetent policemen featured in silent film slapstick comedies produced by Mack Sennett for his Keystone Film Company between 1912 and 1917.

History

The idea for the Keystone Cops came from Hank Mann, and they were named for the Keystone studio, the film production company founded in 1912 by Sennett. Their first film was Hoffmeyer's Legacy (1912), with Mann playing the part of police chief Tehiezel, but their popularity stemmed from the 1913 short The Bangville Police starring Mabel Normand, which had Ford Sterling in the role of chief.

As early as 1914, Sennett shifted the Keystone Cops from starring roles to background ensemble in support of comedians such as Charlie Chaplin and Fatty Arbuckle. The Keystone Cops served as supporting players for Marie Dressler, Mabel Normand, and Chaplin in the first full-length Sennett comedy feature Tillie's Punctured Romance (1914); Mabel's New Hero (1913) with Normand and Arbuckle; Making a Living (1914) with Chaplin in his first pre-Tramp screen appearance; In the Clutches of the Gang (1914) with Normand, Arbuckle, and Al St. John; and Wished on Mabel (1915) with Arbuckle and Normand, among others. Comic actors Chester Conklin, Jimmy Finlayson, and Ford Sterling were also Keystone Cops, as was director Del Lord.

The original Keystone Cops were George Jeske, Bobby Dunn, Mack Riley, Charles Avery, Slim Summerville, Edgar Kennedy, and Hank Mann. In 2010, the lost short A Thief Catcher was discovered at an antique sale in Michigan. It was filmed in 1914 and stars Ford Sterling, Mack Swain, Edgar Kennedy, and Al St. John and includes a previously unknown appearance of Charlie Chaplin as a Keystone Cop.

Revivals 
Mack Sennett continued to use the Keystone Cops intermittently through the 1920s, but their popularity had waned by the time that sound films arrived. In 1935, director Ralph Staub staged a revival of the Sennett gang for his Warner Brothers short subject Keystone Hotel, featuring a re-creation of the Kops clutching at their hats, leaping in the air in surprise, running energetically in any direction, and taking extreme pratfalls. The Staub version of the Keystone Cops became a template for later re-creations. 20th Century Fox's 1939 film Hollywood Cavalcade had Buster Keaton in a Keystone chase scene. Abbott and Costello Meet the Keystone Kops (1955) included a lengthy chase scene, showcasing a group of stuntmen dressed as Sennett's squad. (Two original Keystone Cops in this film were Heinie Conklin as an elderly studio guard and Hank Mann as a prop man. Sennett also starred in a cameo appearance as himself).

Richard Lester's A Hard Day's Night (1964) has a scene where the reminiscent Keystone cops chase the Beatles around the streets.

In Sydney, Australia, in the 1960s, Rod Hull, Desmond Tester and Penny Spence featured in a local homage series of TV comedy shorts, Caper Cops. "It’s a direct steal of the American Keystone Kops [sic], but this is Sydney, Australia, in the late 1960s and who cares..." said creator/star Hull.

Mel Brooks directed a car chase scene in the Keystone Cops' style in his comedy film Silent Movie (1976).

Canceled cartoon shorts
In the late 1960s, Warner Bros.-Seven Arts pitched to create a series of animated cartoon short films based on the Keystone Cops, before being scrapped permanently following the closure of Warner’s original animation studio in 1969.

In popular culture 
The name has since been used to criticize any group for its mistakes and lack of coordination, particularly if either trait was exhibited after a great deal of energy and activity. For example, in criticizing the Department of Homeland Security's response to Hurricane Katrina, Senator Joseph Lieberman claimed that emergency workers under DHS chief Michael Chertoff "ran around like Keystone Kops, uncertain about what they were supposed to do or uncertain how to do it."

In sport, the term has come into common usage by television commentators, particularly in the United Kingdom and Ireland. The rugby commentator Liam Toland uses the term to describe a team's incompetent performance on the pitch. The phrase "Keystone cops defending" has become a catchphrase for describing a situation in an English football match where a defensive error or a series of defensive errors leads to a goal. The term was also used in American Football commentary to describe the play of the New York Jets against the New England Patriots in the 2012 Butt Fumble game, with sportscaster Cris Collinsworth declaring "This is the Keystone Cops", after the Jets gave up 21 points in 51 seconds.

According to Dave Filoni, supervising director of the animated television series Star Wars: The Clone Wars, the look of the police droid is based on the appearance of the Keystone Kops.

The 1983 video game Keystone Kapers, released for the Atari 2600, 5200, MSX and Colecovision, by Activision, featured Keystone Kop Officer Kelly.

The open-source 1987 video game NetHack features Keystone Kops as a type of enemy, appearing whenever a player steals from an in-game shop.

In 2022 Tom Cooper, an Austrian military analyst and book writer, repeatedly used 'Keystone Cops in Moscow' as an alias for the Russian Ministry of Defense.

See also 
 Monty Banks
 Glen Cavender
 Funny Business (TV series)

References

Further reading 
 Basinger, Jeanine, (1999), chapter on Keystone Kops (also covers Mabel Normand) in Silent Stars, .
 
 Davis, Lon & Debra compiled and edited by, (2020), Chase! A Tribute to the Keystone Cops, BearManor Media, Orlando, .

External links 
Feature films
 Hoffmeyer's Legacy (1912)
 The Bangville Police (1913) with Mabel Normand
The Gangsters (1913) with Roscoe Arbuckle, Ford Sterling, and Al St. John
 Barney Oldfield's Race for a Life (1913) with Mabel Normand
 Mabel's New Hero (1913) with Mabel Normand and Roscoe Arbuckle
 Making a Living (1914) (Available to watch/download from the Internet Archive) with Charles Chaplin
 Tillie's Punctured Romance (1914) (Available to watch/download from the Internet Archive) with Marie Dressler, Mabel Normand, and Charles Chaplin
 In the Clutches of the Gang (1914) with Roscoe Arbuckle, Mabel Normand, and Al St. John
 The Noise of Bombs (1914) with Edgar Kennedy as police chief
 Love, Loot and Crash (1915) (Available to watch/download from the Internet Archive) with Charley Chase
 Wished on Mabel (1915) with Roscoe Arbuckle and Mabel Normand
 Love, Speed and Thrills (1915) (Available to watch/download from the Internet Archive) with Mack Swain, Minta Durfee, and Chester Conklin

American film series
Fictional police officers in films
Police comedies
Film characters introduced in 1912
Slapstick comedy
Slapstick films
Silent comedy films
American black-and-white films
Films directed by Mack Sennett
1910s police films
Comedy franchises